Stefan Aleksandrov (born 4 November 1946) is a Bulgarian boxer. He competed in the men's light flyweight event at the 1968 Summer Olympics. At the 1968 Summer Olympics, he lost to Gabriel Ogun of Nigeria.

References

1946 births
Living people
Bulgarian male boxers
Olympic boxers of Bulgaria
Boxers at the 1968 Summer Olympics
Sportspeople from Plovdiv
Light-flyweight boxers